Vederian Lowe (born April 17, 1999) is an American football offensive tackle for the Minnesota Vikings of the National Football League (NFL). He played college football at Illinois.

Professional career

Lowe was drafted by the Minnesota Vikings in the sixth round, 184th overall, of the 2022 NFL Draft.

References

External links
 Minnesota Vikings bio
 Illinois Fighting Illini bio

1999 births
Living people
Sportspeople from Rockford, Illinois
Players of American football from Illinois
American football offensive tackles
Illinois Fighting Illini football players
Minnesota Vikings players